Make Believe was an indie rock band, initially formed as a touring version of Joan of Arc. The band was initially composed of eccentric voiced singer Tim Kinsella, guitarist Sam Zurick, bassist Bobby Burg, and drummer/keyboardist Nate Kinsella. After 3 months of touring as Joan Of Arc the quartet returned home and decided to begin writing new songs with a more aggressive approach. Following a self-titled 5 track EP, their first full-length Shock of Being was released on October 4, 2005, followed by Of Course in 2006.

On June 20, 2007, Tim Kinsella announced on the Joan of Arc website that he was no longer a member of Make Believe. He attributed his departure to feeling a lessening connection to the "rock band lifestyle", and to a desire to spend more time with his wife. The same announcement stated that Kinsella had "a pile of new songs to pull from for a new Joan of Arc record." The entry implied that the band would continue without Kinsella, but Kinsella returned to the band at the outset of their spring 2008 tour. The band then disbanded the same year.

Members
Tim Kinsella - vocals, bass guitar (2003-2008)
Sam Zurick - guitar (2003-2008)
Bobby Burg - bass guitar (2003-2008)
Nate Kinsella - drums, wurlitzer (2003-2008)

Discography
Albums
Shock of Being CD/LP (released on Flameshovel Records, 2005)
Of Course CD/LP (released on Flameshovel Records, 2006)
Going To The Bone Church CD/LP (released on Flameshovel Records, 2008)

Compilations
The Association of Utopian Hologram Swallowers 2x7" (released on Polyvinyl Records, 2005)

EPs/Singles/7"
Make Believe CD EP (released on Flameshovel Records, 2004)
The Pink 7" (released on Flameshovel Records, 2004)
Can't Tell Cop From Cap Flexi-disc (released on Joyful Noise, 2012)

References

Indie rock musical groups from Illinois
Musical groups from Chicago
Flameshovel Records artists